The 2007 Leeds City Council election took place on Thursday 3 May 2007 to elect members of Leeds City Council in England.

As per the election cycle, one third of the council's 99 seats were contested. Those seats up for election were those of the second-placed candidate elected for every ward at the 2004 all-out election, who had been granted a three year term to expire in 2007.

Despite Labour gaining three council seats, the council remained in no overall control as no political party had an overall majority of councillors. In coalition since 2004, the Liberal Democrat and Conservative council administration continued.

Election result

This result had the following consequences for the total number of seats on the council after the elections:

Councillors who did not stand for re-election

Ward results

Notes

References

2007 English local elections
2007
2000s in Leeds